Mooi River may refer to:
 Mooi River (Vaal), a tributary of the Vaal
 Mooi River (Tugela), a tributary of the Tugela River in KwaZulu-Natal
 Mooi River (town),  a town by the Mooi River in KwaZulu-Natal
 Mooi River (Tsitsa), a river in the Eastern Cape Province, a tributary of the Tsitsa River